Estonian Wrestling Federation (abbreviation EWF) is one of the sport governing bodies in Estonia which deals with wrestling.

The history of EWF goes back to 1920 when the organization was established. In 1933 the organization was established. During the Estonian SSR period, the Estonian SSR Wrestling Federation existed.

EWF is a member of United World Wrestling (UWW).

References

External links
 

Sports governing bodies in Estonia
Wrestling in Estonia
National members of the European Council of Associated Wrestling